Anda Eibele (born 30 July 1984 in Riga) is a Latvian women's basketball player with the Latvia women's national basketball team. She competed with the team at the 2008 Summer Olympics, where she scored 3 points in 5 games.

References

External links
 
 
 
 

1984 births
Living people
Latvian women's basketball players
Olympic basketball players of Latvia
Basketball players at the 2008 Summer Olympics
Basketball players from Riga
ŽKK Gospić players